Reginald Alan Hudlin (born December 15, 1961) is an American film screenwriter, director, producer, and comic-book writer. Along with his older brother Warrington Hudlin, he is known as one of the Hudlin Brothers. From 2005 to 2008, Hudlin was President of Entertainment for Black Entertainment Television (BET). Hudlin has also written numerous graphic novels. He co-produced the 88th Academy Awards ceremony in 2016 as well as other TV specials.

Hudlin's breakout film was 1990's House Party. He also directed the 1992 film Boomerang. Alongside Warrington, he executive produced the 1994 anthology television film Cosmic Slop, and directed the first of the film's three segments, "Space Traders". Hudlin worked as a producer on the 2012 film Django Unchained, directed by Quentin Tarantino, which received an Academy Award nomination for Best Picture.

Early life 
Hudlin was born in Centreville, Illinois, the son of two teachers. Hudlin's older brother, Warrington Hudlin, is also a film director, as well as an actor and producer.

The Hudlins grew up in East St. Louis, Illinois, where the family had deep roots. The Hudlin Brothers are paternal great-great-grandsons of Peter and Nancy Hudlin, who were part of the Underground Railroad. Their great uncle was tennis instructor Richard A. Hudlin, who mentored Arthur Ashe and Althea Gibson.

The Hudlins attended Katherine Dunham's Center for the Performing Arts, an experimental school, Warrington for high school and Reginald for after school martial arts classes. Hudlin has said that the experience was formative, and led to his older brother attending Yale University, and his attending Harvard University. In 1979, Hudlin graduated from Assumption High School in East St. Louis.

While an undergraduate at Harvard University, Hudlin directed his thesis project, a short film called House Party, which received numerous awards including first place at the Black American Cinema Society Awards. The film was inspired by his experience growing up in East St. Louis. In 1983, Hudlin graduated magna cum laude from Harvard with a B.A. in Visual and Environmental Studies. His short film thesis was the basis for his first feature film, House Party.

Career 
After college, Hudlin and his brother formed a production company and made music videos for such artists as Heavy D, Jamaica Boys, and others. They additionally created the "Hey Love" 1980s TV commercial for a various-artists compilation record, that played regularly on late night TV.

Hudlin directed—with older brother Warrington producing—his first feature-length film, 1990's low-budget teen hip-hop comedy House Party, which starred Kid 'n Play. One of the messages of the film was its promotion of safe sex. The film, distributed by New Line Cinema, was, according to Variety, one of the most profitable films of the decade. New Line wanted to make sequels, but the Hudlins did not feel the compensation or deals were adequate.

Hudlin directed 1992's Boomerang, again with older brother Warrington producing. The film was a big-budget romantic comedy that starred Eddie Murphy, who had a term deal at Paramount Pictures and hired the Hudlin Brothers because he liked House Party. It starred an all-black cast that included Robin Givens, Halle Berry, Martin Lawrence, David Alan Grier, and Chris Rock. Boomerang was based on an original idea by Murphy and was written by Saturday Night Live writers Barry W. Blaustein and David Sheffield.

A celebration of the 25th anniversary of Boomerang's release was held on July 1, 2017, at the National Museum of African American History and Culture in Washington, D.C., with a conversation between Hudlin and producer George Alexander.

In 1992, while making Boomerang, Hudlin directed the first Black animated film, Bébé's Kids, which was championed by Paramount's Brandon Tartikoff, and was made in memory of comedian Robin Harris, who had died in 1990.

In 1994, the Hudlin Brothers produced the HBO anthology television film Cosmic Slop, of which Hudlin directed the segment "Space Traders". The segment is an adaptation of the short story "The Space Traders" by Derrick Bell, found in Bell's book Faces at the Bottom of the Well: The Permanence of Racism.

He then directed The Great White Hype, The Ladies Man, Serving Sara (2002), two episodes of the TV series Modern Family, an episode of The Office, an episode of The Middle, and several episodes of Outsourced.  He was also a recurring producer and director of The Bernie Mac Show for three years.

From 2005 to 2008, Hudlin was the President of Entertainment for BET. Notable shows shepherded by Hudlin at that time included the documentary series American Gangster and Sunday Best, a gospel-music singing-competition show. Hudlin created The BET Honors and the BET Hip Hop Awards.

Hudlin wrote the Marvel Comics series Black Panther from 2005 to 2008, including the 2006 storyline "Bride of the Panther," which saw the character marry X-Men leader Storm.

Hudlin was a producer of Quentin Tarantino's Django Unchained, starring Jamie Foxx, Leonardo DiCaprio, Christoph Waltz, Kerry Washington, and Samuel L. Jackson. On January 10, 2013, Hudlin received an Academy Award nomination for Best Picture for the film.

Since 2013, Hudlin has been executive producer of the NAACP Image Awards.

In 2014, Hudlin produced the Black Movie Soundtrack celebration of Black music in movies, held at Los Angeles' Hollywood Bowl and hosted by Craig Robinson. Black Movie Soundtrack II, also hosted by Robinson, was held in 2016.

In 2015, DC Comics announced that Hudlin and artists Denys Cowan and Derek Dingle would be part of the relaunch of the publisher's Milestone Media imprint, founded by Cowan, Dingle and Dwayne McDuffie. The comic line returned in September 2020 with the Hudlin-penned Milestone Returns #0.

In 2015, Hudlin joined the board of the Comic Book Legal Defense Fund, a non-profit organization founded in 1986 chartered to protect the First Amendment rights of the comics community.

By June 2017, Hudlin had been hired to direct a movie based on the comic Shadowman. That October, Hudlin's film Marshall, about Thurgood Marshall, the first African-American U.S. Supreme Court justice, starring Chadwick Boseman, was released.

Hudlin contributed a story to the Black Panther Annual #1, released in February 2018. By July the following year, Hudlin had been hired to direct the Walt Disney Pictures film Safety for Disney+.

On July 12, 2021, it was announced that Hudlin along with Ian Stewart will the executive producers for the 73rd Enmmy Awards which will have a live audience on September 19, 2021 on CBS.

Personal life 
In 2002, Hudlin married Chrisette Hudlin (née Suter), a public relations consultant, in Montego Bay, Jamaica. They have two children.

Reginald Hudlin's lawyer at the time was Doug Emhoff. In 2013, Chrisette Hudlin set up Emhoff on a blind date with then-Attorney General of California and future Vice-President, Kamala Harris.

Filmography

Feature films

Producer only
 Ride (1998)
 Django Unchained (2012)
 Burning Sands (2017)
 Paws of Fury: The Legend of Hank (2022) (Executive Producer)
 House Party (2023) (Executive Producer)

Acting roles

Documentary Appearances
 Milestone Generations (2022) (Associate Producer)

Short films

Television

Executive producer only

TV specials

Awards 
 1986: Black American Cinema Society (film archives of the Western States Black Research Center), Black Independent Video and Film-maker's Awards, $1,500 first prize for House Party (short)
 1990: Sundance Film Festival, Filmmakers Trophy for House Party
 1990: Sundance Film Festival, Grand Jury Prize for House Party – nominee
 1990: Deauville Film Festival, Critics Award for House Party – nominee
 1991: Film Independent Spirit Award, Best First Feature for House Party – nominee
 1991: Film Independent Spirit Award, Best Director for House Party – nominee
 1995: CableACE, Dramatic or Theatrical Special for Cosmic Slop
 2012: American Film Institute Awards 2012 for Django Unchained, Top 10 Films
 2013: Academy Award for Best Picture for Django Unchained – nominee
 2013: Golden Globe Award for Best Motion Picture – Drama for Django Unchained – nominee
 2013: PGA Awards, Outstanding Producer of Theatrical Motion Pictures for Django Unchained – nominee
 2015: Comic Con, Icon Award
 2016: African-American Film Critics Association, Salute to Excellence Award
 2016: Primetime Emmy Award for Outstanding Special Class Program for 88th Academy Awards – nominee
2021: Recipient of (Miami University of Ohio) Miami’s Summer of ‘64 Award for his contributions in bringing the Black image to screen.

Leadership and membership 
 UCLA School of Theater, Film and Television, Board Member
 Academy of Motion Picture Arts and Sciences, Board of Governors

Works and publications 
Comics
 
 
  – Contains material originally published in magazine form as Marvel Knights Spider-man #13-18
 
 
 
  – Contains material originally published in single magazine form as: Black Panther #26-30
  – Also includes Black Panther: Black to the Future
 
  – Contains material originally published in magazine form as Black Panther #31-34
  – Collecting Black Panther #1-6
 
  – Contains material originally published in magazine form as Black Panther #7-12
  – Originally published in single magazine form in Django Unchained #1-7
  – Contains material originally published in magazine form as Doomwar #1-6

Selected writing

See also 
 Warrington Hudlin
 Black Panther

References

Further reading 
 
 
 
 
  "Part 2". "Part 3". "Part 4". "Part 5".

External links

 Hudlin Entertainment
 Reggie's World
 
 
 

1961 births
African-American comics creators
American comics creators
African-American film directors
African-American television directors
American comics writers
American television directors
Harvard University alumni
Living people
People from Centreville, Illinois
Film directors from Illinois
Phi Beta Sigma Brothers
21st-century African-American people
20th-century African-American people